Waterloo Community Mausoleum is a historic mausoleum located in Maplewood Cemetery at Waterloo, DeKalb County, Indiana.  It was built in 1916, and is a one-story, rectangular limestone structure with simple Classical Revival style detail and Gothic buttresses.  It measures 44 feet wide and 32 feet deep. The mausoleum was used for interments into the 1960s.

It was added to the National Register of Historic Places in 2014.

References

Monuments and memorials on the National Register of Historic Places in Indiana
Neoclassical architecture in Indiana
Buildings and structures completed in 1916
Buildings and structures in DeKalb County, Indiana
National Register of Historic Places in DeKalb County, Indiana
Mausoleums on the National Register of Historic Places
1916 establishments in Indiana
Death in Indiana